George Sanford (1942/3 – 25 February 2021) was a professor of politics at the University of Bristol, England. He specialised in Polish and East European studies. In particular, he is considered an expert on the Katyn massacre, and published a book on that topic in 2005.  On several occasions he was interviewed on Polish affairs in the mass media.

He died on 25 February 2021 at the age of 78.

Publications
George Sanford has published several books and numerous articles and books chapters. His book publications include:
 Polish Communism in Crisis, 1983
 Military Rule in Poland: The Rebuilding of Communist Power, 1981-1983, 1986
 The Solidarity Congress 1981: The Great Debate, 1990
 Democratization in Poland, 1988-1990: Polish Voices, 1992
 Building Democracy?: The International Dimension of Democratisation in Eastern Europe (ed.), 1994
 Historical Dictionary of Poland, 1994
 Poland: The Conquest of History, 1999
 Democratic Government in Poland : Constitutional Politics Since 1989, 2002
 Katyn and the Soviet Massacre of 1940: Truth, Justice and Memory, 2005

References 

1940s births
Year of birth uncertain
2021 deaths
British political scientists
Academics of the University of Bristol
Historians of Poland